The following is a list of macaronic languages.

 Alemañol (German/Latin American and Mexican Spanish)
 Amideutsch (American English/German) (see Denglisch)
 Catañol (Catalan/Latin American and Mexican Spanish) 
 Castrapo (Galician/Spanish)
 Chinglish (Chinese/American English)
 Cocoliche (Rioplatense Spanish/Italian)
 Czenglish (Czech/English)
 Danglish (Danish/English)
 Denglisch (German/British English)
 Dunglish (Dutch/British English)
 Engrish (East Asian/English)
 Europanto (German/French/Spanish/Italian/English)
 Franglais = Frenglish (Canadian English/Canadian French)
 Frañol/Frespañol = Frespanish (French-Spanish)
 Heblish (Hebrew/English)
 Hinglish (Hindi/English)
 Hunglish (Hungarian/English)
 Hunsrik (German/Brazilian Portuguese)
 Italesco (Italian/German)
 Japlish (Japanese/American English)
 Llanito (English/Andalusian Spanish)
 Kanglish (Kannada/English)
 Poglish (Polish/English) 
 Porglish (Brazilian Portuguese/American English)
 Portuñol/Portunhol (Brazilian Portuguese/Latin American and Mexican Spanish)
 Runglish (Russian/English)
 Singlish (Singaporean English)
 Maltenglish (Maltese/English)
 Manglish (Malay/various Chinese dialects/Tamil/English)
 Senkyoshigo (American English, Japanese]]
 Spanglish (Latin American and Mexican Spanish/American English)
 Surzhyk (Ukrainian/Russian)
 Swenglish (Swedish/British English)
 Taglish (Tagalog/English)
 Trasianka (Belarusian/Russian)
 Urdish (Urdu/English)
 Yinglish (Yiddish/English)

See also
 Macaronic language
 List of lishes
 Pidgin
 List of creole languages
 Catañol
 Lagunen-deutsch

References

Macaronic language
Macaronic